The Indian Open was a defunct men's tennis tournament founded as the India International Championships in 1923. It was played from 1923 until 1979 and the men's event was part of the Grand Prix tennis circuit, 1970 to 1979.  From 1945 to 1972 it was known as the Indian International Championships. It was held in various cities in, India and was played outdoor on multiple surfaces.

History
Tennis was introduuced to India in 1880s by British Army and Civilian Officers. In 1923 the India International Championships were established and played at the Calcutta South Club, Calcutta, West Bengal, India. The championships were not staged during World War II and a few years after Indian Independence in 1947. 

In 1948 the tournament was renamed as the Indian International Championships until 1954, and still held in Calcutta. In 1955 two versions of the championships were held, one the India International Championships from late December till early January, and the Indian International Championships in late January. In 1956 the tournament returned to the latters title. In 1957 two championships were once again held in Calcutta with the same tournament names as in 1955. In 1958 the event then resumed under the Indian International Championships brand name until 1972. In 1973 it was renamed as the Indian Open.

Locations and venues
The Calcutta South Club was founded in 1920, and also organised the Calcutta Lawn Tennis Championships.That tournament later became known as the East India Lawn Tennis Championships. It's current facilties consist of the six original grass courts, In 1985 the Club built six new clay courts, and in 2004 it added five asphalt-based rubberized hard courts.

The India International Championships were predominantly staged in Calcutta, under the new tournament name the Indian International Championships that began in 1948, it continued to held in Calcutta until it moved to Madras in 1959. Over a number of years, the event was also held in other cities such as New Delhi and Bombay.

Finals

Men's singles
Incomplete roll included:

Men's doubles

See also
 All India Championships
 National Lawn Tennis Championships of India

References

Sources
 
http://www.tennisarchives.com/All India Championships 1910–1956

External links
 ATP World Tour archive
 ITF  

Grand Prix tennis circuit
Clay court tennis tournaments
Grass court tennis tournaments
Hard court tennis tournaments
Tennis tournaments in India
Defunct tennis tournaments in India
Defunct sports competitions in India
Recurring sporting events established in 1923
Recurring sporting events disestablished in 1979
1923 establishments in India
1979 disestablishments in India